Albert C. Cohn (December 20, 1885  – January 8, 1959) was a New York State Supreme Court Justice and the father of Roy Cohn. He was influential in Democratic Party politics.

Biography
He was born on December 20, 1885, and married Dora Marcus (1892–1967) in 1924 when he was the First Assistant District Attorney for Bronx County. His son Roy Cohn was born in 1927. Cohn was inducted as a justice of the New York Supreme Court into Part III of Bronx Supreme Court in April 1929. A 1931 decision by Cohn stripped control of amateur boxing in New York from the Amateur Athletic Union (AAU) and placed it under control of the New York State Athletic Commission. In April 1937, Governor Herbert H. Lehman promoted Cohn to a five-year term on the New York Supreme Court, Appellate Division, where his fellow Justices included Irwin Untermyer.

He spearheaded a program for accreditation by the American Bar Association for his alma mater, New York Law School, starting in 1947, which was successful, in 1954. He died on January 8, 1959, in New York City.

References

New York Supreme Court Justices
1885 births
1959 deaths
Lawyers from New York City
American Jews
New York (state) Democrats
20th-century American judges
20th-century American lawyers